The 2018 Iowa gubernatorial election took place on November 6, 2018. Incumbent Republican Governor Kim Reynolds ran for election to a full term, facing Democratic businessman Fred Hubbell, Libertarian Jake Porter, and independent candidate Gary Siegwarth.

On Election Day, Reynolds won 50.3% of the vote, a 2.8% margin of victory, and carried 88 of Iowa's 99 counties. She became the first female governor of Iowa elected in her own right. This was the first Iowa gubernatorial election since 1998 in which the winner was of the same party as the incumbent president.

Background
After the 2016 presidential election, President Donald Trump nominated then-Governor Terry Branstad to be the United States Ambassador to China. When Branstad was confirmed by the United States Senate, he resigned as Iowa Governor to assume the ambassadorship on May 24, 2017. Lieutenant Governor Kim Reynolds then became Governor of Iowa.

Republican primary

Candidates

Nominated
 Kim Reynolds, incumbent Governor of Iowa.

Withdrew
 Ron Corbett, Mayor of Cedar Rapids
 Steven Ray, Mayor pro tempore of Boone

Declined
 Terry Branstad, United States Ambassador to China and former Governor
 Steve King, U.S. Representative
 Bill Northey, U.S. Under Secretary of Agriculture for Farm and Foreign Agricultural Services and former Secretary of Agriculture of Iowa
 Bob Vander Plaats, president and CEO of The Family Leader, candidate for Governor of Iowa in 2002, 2006 and 2010 and nominee for Lieutenant Governor of Iowa in 2006

Endorsements

Results

Democratic primary

Candidates

Nominated
 Fred Hubbell, businessman

Eliminated in primary
 Cathy Glasson, president of SEIU Local 199
 Andy McGuire, former chairwoman of the Iowa Democratic Party and candidate for Lieutenant Governor in 2006
 John Norris, former chief of staff to Governor Tom Vilsack, former Federal Energy Regulatory Commission member and nominee for IA-04 in 2002
 Ross Wilburn, former mayor of Iowa City

Withdrew
 Nate Boulton, state senator
 Rich Leopold, director of the Polk County Conservation Board and former Director of the Iowa Department of Natural Resources
 Mike Matson, Davenport alderman
 Jon Neiderbach, attorney, former member of the Des Moines School Board and nominee for State Auditor in 2014
 Todd Prichard, state representative

Declined
 Chaz Allen, state senator
 Joe Bolkcom, state senator
 Bill Brauch, former director of the Consumer Protection Division of the Iowa Attorney General's Office
 Mike Carberry, Johnson County Supervisor
 Jeff Danielson, state senator
 Michael Gronstal, former Majority Leader of the Iowa Senate
 Chris Hall, state representative
 Rita Hart, state senator (nominee for Lieutenant Governor)
 Jack Hatch, former state senator and nominee for Governor of Iowa in 2014
 Rob Hogg, Minority Leader of the Iowa Senate and candidate for the U.S. Senate in 2016
 Pam Jochum, state senator
 Dave Loebsack, U.S. Representative
 Liz Mathis, state senator
 Jim Mowrer, nominee for IA-04 in 2014 and IA-03 in 2016 (ran for the nomination for Secretary of State)
 Tyler Olson, former state representative, former chairman of the Iowa Democratic Party and candidate for Governor of Iowa in 2014
 Janet Petersen, state senator
 Steve Sodders, former state senator
 Tom Vilsack, former United States Secretary of Agriculture and former Governor of Iowa

Endorsements

Polling

Results

Libertarian primary
Libertarian Party presidential nominee Gary Johnson received 3.8 percent of the votes in Iowa in 2016, surpassing the 2 percent threshold to attain full political party status. As a result, the Libertarian Party was allowed to hold a primary to select a nominee.

Candidates

Nominated
 Jake Porter, business consultant

Declared
 Marco Battaglia, musician
 Jake Porter, nominee for Secretary of State in 2010 and 2014

Endorsements

Results

Independents

Candidates
 Gary Siegwarth, Fisheries Biologist

Withdrew
 Brent Roske, director and candidate for CA-33 in 2014

Endorsements

General election

Debates

Predictions

Polling

with Nate Boulton

with Cathy Glasson

with generic Democrat

with John Norris

with Andy McGuire

Results
While pre-election polls showed Reynolds trailing Hubbell, Reynolds won 50.3% of the vote on Election Day, primarily by sweeping every county west of Des Moines and dominating the 4th Congressional District (she lost the other three). Ultimately, she carried 88 of Iowa's 99 counties. She became the first female governor of Iowa elected in her own right.

See also
Iowa elections, 2018

References

External links
Candidates at Vote Smart
Candidates at Ballotpedia

Official campaign websites
Gary Siegwarth (I) for Governor
Fred Hubbell (D) for Governor
Jake Porter (L) for Governor
Kim Reynolds (R) for Governor

Gubernatorial
2018
2018 United States gubernatorial elections